Iluka may refer to:

Places 
Iluka, New South Wales, a town on the north coast of New South Wales in Australia
Iluka, Western Australia, a suburb of Perth, Western Australia

Other uses
Iluka (building), a building on the Gold Coast in Queensland, Australia
Iluka Nature Reserve in New South Wales, Australia
Iluka Resources, an Australian mining company